Text simplification is an operation used in natural language processing to change, enhance, classify, or otherwise process an existing body of human-readable text so its grammar and structure is greatly simplified while the underlying meaning and information remain the same. Text simplification is an important area of research because of communication needs in an increasingly complex and interconnected world more dominated by science, technology, and new media. But natural human languages pose huge problems because they ordinarily contain large vocabularies and complex constructions that machines, no matter how fast and well-programmed, cannot easily process. However, researchers have discovered that, to reduce linguistic diversity, they can use methods of semantic compression to limit and simplify a set of words used in given texts.

Example 
Text simplification is illustrated with an example used by Siddharthan (2006). The first sentence contains two relative clauses and one conjoined verb phrase. A text simplification system aims to change the first sentence into a group of simpler sentences, as seen just below the first sentence.

 Also contributing to the firmness in copper, the analyst noted, was a report by Chicago purchasing agents, which precedes the full purchasing agents report that is due out today and gives an indication of what the full report might hold.
 Also contributing to the firmness in copper, the analyst noted, was a report by Chicago purchasing agents. The Chicago report precedes the full purchasing agents report. The Chicago report gives an indication of what the full report might hold. The full report is due out today.

One approach to text simplification is lexical simplification via lexical substitution, a two-step process of first identifying complex words and then replacing them with simpler synonyms. A key challenge here is identifying complex words, which is performed by a machine learning classifier trained on labeled data. Researchers, frustrated by the problems with using the classical method of asking research subjects to describe words as either simple or complex, have discovered that they can get a higher consistency in more levels of complexity if they ask labelers to sort words presented to them in order of complexity.

See also 
Automated paraphrasing
Controlled natural language
Language reform
Lexical simplification
Lexical substitution
Semantic compression
Text normalization
Simplified English
Basic English

References 

 Wei Xu, Chris Callison-Burch and Courtney Napoles. "Problems in Current Text Simplification Research". In Transactions of the Association for Computational Linguistics (TACL), Volume 3, 2015, Pages 283–297.
 Advaith Siddharthan. "Syntactic Simplification and Text Cohesion". In Research on Language and Computation, Volume 4, Issue 1, Jun 2006, Pages 77–109, Springer Science, the Netherlands. 
 Siddhartha Jonnalagadda, Luis Tari, Joerg Hakenberg, Chitta Baral and Graciela Gonzalez. Towards Effective Sentence Simplification for Automatic Processing of Biomedical Text. In Proc. of the NAACL-HLT 2009, Boulder, USA, June.

External links
 Automatic Induction of Rules for Text Simplification (pdf)
  Text Simplification for Information-Seeking Applications

Computational linguistics
Speech recognition
Natural language processing
Tasks of natural language processing